Mazu Rural District is a rural district (dehestan) in Alvar-e Garmsiri District, Andimeshk County, Khuzestan Province, Iran. At the 2006 census, its population was 4,117, in 866 families.  The rural district has 54 villages.

References 

Rural Districts of Khuzestan Province
Andimeshk County